The FLQ Manifesto was a key document of the group the Front de libération du Québec. On 8 October 1970, during the October Crisis, it was broadcast by CBC/Radio-Canada television as one of many demands required for the release of kidnapped British Trade Commissioner James Cross. It criticized big business, the Catholic Church, René Lévesque, and Robert Bourassa, and even branded Pierre Trudeau "a queer".

References

External links
The FLQ Manifesto translated and annotated
The French-language broadcast of the Manifesto
The translation of the Manifesto used in the English-language broadcast
CBC—Canada: A People’s History

Mass media in Quebec
October Crisis
Front de libération du Québec
Pierre Trudeau
René Lévesque
1970 documents
Manifestos